Minnetonka is a suburban city in Hennepin County, Minnesota, United States.

Minnetonka may also refer to:
 Minnetonka Cave,  a limestone cave in Idaho, United States
 Minnetonka High School, a high school in Minnetonka, Minnesota, United States
 Lake Minnetonka, an inland lake west-southwest of Minneapolis, Minnesota, United States
 USS Minnetonka (1869) or USS Naubuc
 SS Minnetonka (1901), a passenger ship of the Atlantic Transport Line
 SS Minnetonka (1924), a passenger ship of the Atlantic Transport Line

See also
 Minnetonka Beach, Minnesota, a city in Hennepin County, Minnesota, United States